Miss Colombia 2011 was the 59th edition of the Miss Colombia pageant. It was held on November 14, 2011 in Cartagena, Colombia. 

At the end of the event, Catalina Robayo of Valle crowned Daniella Álvarez of Atlántico as Miss Colombia 2011. She represented Colombia in Miss Universe 2012 but failed to place in the semifinals.

Results

 Color keys

  The contestant was a Finalist/Runner-up in an International pageant.
 The contestant was a Semi-Finalist in an International pageant.
  The contestant did not place.

Special Awards

Scores

Delegates
26 delegates have been selected to compete.

References

External links
Official site

Miss Colombia
2011 in Colombia
2011 beauty pageants